This is a list of women aviators — women prominent in the field of aviation as constructors, designers, pilots and patrons.  

It also includes a list of their relevant organisations such as the Betsy Ross Air Corps and Women's Royal Air Force.

Individuals

A
 Amen Aamir, first women from Gilgit-Baltistan to qualify as a pilot
 Aida de Acosta (1884–1962), first woman to fly a powered aircraft alone
 Margaret Adams, Australian aviator; first president of the Australian Women's Flying Club, in 1938
 Leman Altınçekiç (1932–2001), first female accredited jet pilot (1958) in Turkey and NATO.
 Princess Anne of Löwenstein-Wertheim-Freudenberg (1864–1927), second woman to attempt a flight across the Atlantic
 Gaby Angelini (1911–1932), first Italian woman to complete a trans-European flight
 Kimberly Anyadike (born 1994), youngest African-American female pilot to complete a transcontinental flight
 Cecilia Aragon (born 1960), first Latina pilot on the United States Aerobatic Team
 Tamar Ariel (1989–2014), Israel's first Jewish female religiously observant air force pilot, in 2012
 Jacqueline Auriol (1917–2000), French test pilot who rivalled Jacqueline Cochran in breaking speed records
 Micky Axton (1919–2010), one of the first three Women Air Force Service Pilots (WASPs) to be trained as a test pilot; first woman to fly a B-29

 Asli Hassan Abade,  First African female fighter jet pilot. A prominent Somali Air Force pilot, military figure, and civil activist.
 Zoya Agarwal, world's youngest woman pilot to fly the Boeing 777 (2013), captained world's longest flight route over North Pole (2021)

B

 Pancho Barnes (1901–1975), granddaughter of balloonist Thaddeus Lowe; founded the Women's Air Reserve, Associated Motion Picture Pilots and became the "mother of the Air Force"
 Mary Barr (1925–2010), first female pilot to join the US Forest Service and become National Aviation Safety Officer
 Jean Batten (1909–1982), made first solo flight from United Kingdom to New Zealand in the 1930s
 Ann Baumgartner (1918–2008), test pilot; first American woman to fly a U.S. Army Air Forces jet aircraft (a Bell YP-59A jet fighter)
 Amelie Beese (1886–1925), first woman pilot in Germany
 Elly Beinhorn (1907–2007), German enthusiast who made long-distance flights on every continent and flew around the world
Dagny Berger (1903–1950), Norway's first woman aviator
 Susana Ferrari Billinghurst (1914–1999), Argentinian pilot; first woman in South America to gain a commercial pilot's licence, in 1937
 Lilian Bland (1878–1971), built her own aircraft; first woman to fly in Ireland
 Line Bonde (born c.1979), first Danish woman to become a fighter pilot, in 2006
 Maude Bonney (1897–1994), Australian aviator who was the first female to fly from England to Australia in 1933 and to South Africa in 1937.
Ana Branger (born early 1920s), early Venezuelan aviator
 Jill E. Brown (born 1950), first African American female pilot for a major US carrier
 Willa Brown (1906–1992), first black woman to hold both a commercial and private licence in the US; founded the National Negro Airmen Association of America; first black female to be an officer in the Civil Air Patrol
 Mrs Victor Bruce (1895–1990), born Mildred Mary but most famous by her married name; first woman to fly around the world alone and the first to be prosecuted for speeding
 Millicent Bryant (1878–1927), first woman to earn a pilot's licence in Australia
 Beverly Burns (born 1949), American pilot, possibly the first woman to captain a jumbo jet (see Lynn Rippelmeyer)

C

Mary Calcaño (1906–1992), first Venezuelan woman to be granted a pilot's license
 Maie Casey (1892–1983), first patron of the Australian Association of Woman Pilots

 Pearl Laska Chamberlain (1909–2012), first woman to solo a single-engine airplane up the Alaska Highway (1946)
Katherine Cheung (1904–2003), first Chinese-American woman to get a pilot's licence
Robyn Clay-Williams, one of the first two female pilots in the Royal Australian Air Force and the service's first female test pilot
Jerrie Cobb (1931–2019), first woman to fly in the Paris Air Show and to be tested as an astronaut
Jacqueline Cochran (1908–1980), first woman to fly faster than the speed of sound
Bessie Coleman (1892–1926), first African-American woman pilot, earned her license in France 1921
Eileen Collins (born 1956), former test pilot and NASA astronaut; first female pilot and first female commander of a space shuttle
Linda Corbould, first woman to command a Royal Australian Air Force flying squadron
Nancy Corrigan (1912–1983), an Irish-born, early U.S. aviator who became a successful instructor and commercial pilot  
Jessica Cox (born 1983), world's first armless licensed pilot
Mary Rawlinson Creason (1924–2021), first woman hired by the Government of Michigan
Gráinne Cronin (born c. 1953), first female pilot hired by Aer Lingus, the national airline of Ireland
Lettice Curtis (1915–2014), early member of the Air Transport Auxiliary; first woman to fly a four-engined bomber

D
 Mildred Inks Davidson Dalrymple (1920–2012), military aviator
Susan Darcy (born 1956), first female test pilot for Boeing
Vera Strodl Dowling (1918–2015), Danish World War II test pilot and later flight instructor in Alberta, Canada
Mariana Drăgescu (1912–2013), Romanian military pilot in World War II
 Margot Duke, Marchioness of Reading (1919–2015), society beauty who was one of the first women in Britain to get a pilot's licence
 Maxine Dunlap (1908–1977), first woman glider pilot and first woman glider club president in the U.S.
 Hélène Dutrieu (1877–1961), first woman pilot in Belgium and to carry a passenger; caused a sensation by flying without a corset

E
 Amelia Earhart (1897–1937), first woman to fly solo across the Atlantic
 Amelia Rose Earhart (born 1983), reporter and pilot
 Lotfia Elnadi (1907–2002), first Egyptian woman to earn her pilot license 1933
 Ruth Elder (1902–1977), pilot and actress known as the "Miss America of Aviation"
Mary Ellis (1917–2018), one of the last surviving British women pilots from World War II

F
 Rosina Ferrario (1888–1957), first Italian woman to receive a pilot's licence, in January 1913
 Amalia Celia Figueredo (1895–1985), Argentine aviator; first woman in Argentina, and possibly Latin America, to obtain a pilot's license in 1914 with Paul Castaibert
 Kathleen Fox (born 1951), Canadian flight instructor, air traffic controller and business executive
 Mathilde Franck (1866–1956), early French aviator; learned to fly in 1910
 Wally Funk (born 1939), one of the Mercury 13; first female air safety investigator at the FAA

G

 Maggie Gee (1923–2013), American aviator who served in the Women Airforce Service Pilots (WASPs) in World War II
 Betty Gillies (1908–1998), pioneering American aviator; first pilot to qualify for the Women's Auxiliary Ferrying Squadron
 Sabiha Gökçen (1913–2001), adopted by Kemal Atatürk; World's first female combat pilot
 Maya Ghazal, Syrian refugee and pilot
 Patricia Graham (1928–2016), Australian aviator, founding member of the Australian Women Pilots' Association in 1950
 Valentina Grizodubova (1909–1993), long distance flyer and wartime hero; the most decorated woman in the Soviet Union
 Julie Ann Gibson (born 1956), Flight Lieutenant Julie Ann Gibson was the first full-time female pilot for the Royal Air Force when she graduated in 1991
 Mette Grøtteland (born 1969), first female fighter pilot of The Royal Norwegian Air Force.

H
 Melissa Haney (born 1981), Air Inuit's first female Inuk pilot to become captain
 Else Haugk (1889–1973), first Swiss woman to earn a pilot's licence, in May 1914
 Mary, Lady Heath (1896–1939), first woman to fly solo across Africa from Cape Town to Cairo
 Jane Herveu (1885–1955), pioneering French aviator; received her licence on 7 December 1910
 Hilda Hewlett (1864–1943), first woman to get a British pilot's licence and to open the first flying school there
Trevor Hunter (1915–2002), early New Zealand aviator
 Tadashi Hyōdō (1899–1980), first woman to obtain a pilot's licence in Japan, in March 1922.

J
 Gidsken Jakobsen (1908–1990), Norwegian aviation pioneer
 Suzanne Jannin (1912–1982), French Air Force pilot in Indochina
 Mary Goodrich Jenson (1907–2004), first woman to fly solo to Cuba; first woman to earn a pilot's license in Connecticut
 Amy Johnson (1903–1941), first woman to fly from England to Australia alone

K
 Elvy Kalep (1899–1989), Estonia's first female pilot
 Shawna Rochelle Kimbrell (born 1976), first African American female fighter pilot in U.S. Air Force 
 Zinaïda Kokorina (1898–1980), Russian pilot and flight instructor, in 1925 became the world's first female military pilot
 Opal Kunz (1894–1967), founding member and first president of the Ninety-Nines; founding member and first president of the Betsy Ross Air Corps; as an instructor in the Civilian Pilot Training Program, she trained over 400 cadets in the Air Corps during World War II

L
 Raymonde de Laroche (1882–1919), first woman in the world to get a pilot's licence
 Ruth Law (1887–1970), American aviator who looped the loop twice at Daytona Beach in 1915
 Constance Leathart (1903–1993), first British woman outside London to get a pilot's licence
 Hazel Ying Lee (1912–1944), Chinese-American pilot who flew for the U.S. Army Air Forces during World War II
 Olga Lisikova (1916–2011), only woman pilot-in-command of a C-47 Skytrain in the Soviet Air Force 
 Lydia Litvyak (1921–1943), fighter ace; first woman to shoot down an aircraft
 Ila Loetscher (1904–2000), female aviation pioneer and activist on behalf of sea turtles
 Rose Lok (1912–1978), first female Chinese-American pilot in New England

M
 Elsie MacGill (1905–1980), world's first female aircraft designer, known as "Queen of the Hurricanes" 
 Beryl Markham (1902–1986), first woman to fly west across the Atlantic alone, direct from England to North America
 Marie Marvingt (1875–1963), first woman to fly from Europe to England across the North Sea by balloon
 Angela Masson (born 1951), first woman to qualify to fly a jumbo jet
Luisa Elena Contreras Mattera (1922–2006), in 1943, first woman to be granted a pilot's license in Venezuela
 Suzanne Melk (1908–1951), the first known women in France to fly and the first women in Europe to receive a pilot's license in 1935
 Pamela Melroy (born 1961), former NASA astronaut who served as pilot and commander on Space Shuttle missions
 Betty Miller (1926–2018), first woman to fly solo across the Pacific
 Violet Milstead (1919–2014), Canadian Air Transport Auxiliary pilot during WWII and the first female bush pilot
Karina Miranda, Chilean Air Force combat aviator and the first woman from her country to break the sound barrier
 Jerrie Mock (1925–2014), first woman to fly solo around the world
 Jennifer Murray (born 1940), first woman to fly solo around the world in a helicopter
 Siza Mzimela, founder of South African airline

N
 Lyalya Nasukhanova (1939–2000), first Chechen woman pilot; rejected by the cosmonaut corps because of her ethnicity
 Yichida Ndlovu, first civilian pilot in Zambia
 Carina Negrone (1911–1991), Italian aviator; reached a record-breaking 12,043 metres (39,402 ft) in a propeller-powered plane
 Ruth Nichols (1901–1960), set many aviation records and started the first air ambulance service in the US
 Marthe Niel (1878–1928), French aviator; second woman in the world to receive a pilot's licence
 Sakhile Nyoni, first woman pilot in Botswana

O

 Sicele O'Brien (1887–1931), one of Ireland's pioneering female pilots who raced and set records in Europe and Africa in the 1920s
 Ruth Law Oliver, first woman pilot to wear a military uniform and the first to deliver air mail to the Philippines
 Phoebe Omlie (1902–1975), first woman to receive an airplane mechanic's license; first licensed woman transport pilot

P
 Suzanne Parish (1922–2010), member of the Women Airforce Service Pilots; co-founder of the Kalamazoo Aviation History Museum
 Ingrid Pedersen (1933–2012), first woman to fly over the North Pole
 Thérèse Peltier (1873–1926), French aviator; first woman to pilot a heavier-than-air craft at Turin in 1908

Q
 Harriet Quimby (1875–1912), first woman to get a U.S. pilot's licence and fly across the English Channel

R
 Carol Rabadi (born 1977), Captain of the first all-female flight crew on Royal Jordanian
 Bessie Raiche (1875–1932), one of the first women to fly solo in the US (see Blanche Scott)
 Rosemary Rees (1901–1994), leading British aviator at the Air Transport Auxiliary 
 Molly Reilly (1922–1980), first female Canadian pilot to reach the rank of captain, and the first woman to fly to the Arctic professionally 
 Hanna Reitsch (1912–1979), German glider pilot who established many records and became a test pilot in WWII
 Ola Mildred Rexroat (1917–2017), only Native American woman to serve in the Women Airforce Service Pilots (WASPs)
Helen Richey (1909–1947), first woman to be hired as a pilot by a commercial airline in the United States
 Mary Riddle (1902–1981), second Native American woman to earn a pilot's license after Bessie Coleman
 Isabel Rilvas (1935), first Portuguese woman acrobatic pilot, parachutist and balloonist, who inspired the Portuguese Paratroop Nurses
 Margaret Ringenberg (1921–2008), started as a WASP and then won hundreds of trophies racing
 Lynn Rippelmeyer, one of the first women to captain a jumbo jet (see Beverly Burns)
 Ada Rogato (1910–1986), record-breaking Brazilian woman aviator
 Molly Rose (1920–2016), flew Spitfires for the Air Transport Auxiliary during WWII
Nadia Russo (1901–1988), pioneering Romanian aviator
Zara Rutherford (born 2002), youngest female pilot to fly solo around the world, at age 19
Margaret Fane Rutledge (1914–2004), pioneering Canadian pilot

S

 Maria de Lourdes Sá Teixeira (1907–1984). First Portuguese woman to hold a pilot's licence
 Nicola Scaife, Australian hot-air balloonist; winner of the FAI Women's Championship in 2014 and 2016
 Melitta Schenk Gräfin von Stauffenberg (1903–1945), aeronautical engineer who became a Luftwaffe test pilot during WWII
 Blanche Scott (1884–1970), possibly the first American women to fly solo (see Bessie Raiche)
 Sheila Scott (1922–1988), first person to fly over the North Pole in a light aircraft
 Tammie Jo Shults (born 1961), one of the first US Navy fighter pilots and captain of Southwest Airlines Flight 1380
 Betty Skelton (1926–2011), the fastest woman on Earth
 Elinor Smith (1911–2010), "Flying Flapper of Freeport" who was, at age sixteen, the youngest licensed pilot in the world
 Eula Pearl Carter Scott (1915–2005) of Chickasaw Nation became the youngest pilot to solo in the U.S., at 13 in her Curtiss Robin OX-5 on September 12, 1929.
 Ida Van Smith (1917–2003), educator who was the first African-American woman in the International Forest of Friendship
 Neta Snook (1896–1991), first woman to run an aviation business; taught Amelia Earhart how to fly
 Winifred Spooner (1900–1933), British aviator; most outstanding female aviator of 1929
 Katherine Stinson (1891–1977), "Flying Schoolgirl" who was the first woman to loop the loop; sister of Marjorie Stinson
 Marjorie Stinson (1895–1975), American exhibition pilot and instructor and the first female airmail pilot in the United States; sister of Katherine Stinson
Marina Știrbei (1912–2001), Romanian aviator who founded the women's White Squadron in World War II
Antonie Strassmann (1901–1952), German an aerobatic aviator (emigrated to the US in 1932), who flew a Zeppelin from Germany to Pernambuco, Brazil in 1932. She performed aerobatic flights, including at the 1930 National Air Races in Chicago, represented and consulted with aviation companies, and gave interviews to the press.
Maguba Syrtlanova (1912–1971), flight instructor, flight commander, wartime hero.

T
 Louise Thaden (1905–1979), winner of the first Powder Puff Derby
 Penny Thompson (1917–1975), American aviator, promoter of women's intercontinental air shows, and aviation publisher
 Bonnie Tiburzi (born 1948), first female pilot for American Airlines and the first female pilot for a major American commercial airline.
 Bobbi Trout (1906–2003), set endurance records and was the first woman to fly all night

V
 Polly Vacher (born 1944), flew solo around the world in a record-breaking small plane
Dolors Vives Rodon (1909–2007), pioneering Catalan aviator

W
 Patty Wagstaff (born 1951), first woman to win the US Aerobatic Championship
 Nancy Bird Walton (1915–2009), pioneering Australian aviator who founded the Australian Women Pilots' Association
 Zheng Wang (Julie Wang, Wang Zheng, 王争) (born 1972), first Asian woman to circumnavigate Earth in an airplane, first Chinese person to fly solo around-the-world; first Chinese female pilot to fly around the world
 Emily Howell Warner (1939–2020), first woman captain of a scheduled US airline
 Fay Gillis Wells (1908–2002), founder member of the Ninety-Nines and its first secretary; one of the earliest female members of the Caterpillar Club
 Cicely Ethel Wilkinson (c.1882–1967), pioneering British pilot
 Benedetta Willis (1914–2008), one of the first 5 women to get RAF wings, in the 1950s.
 Edna Gardner Whyte (1902–1992), trained many military pilots in WWII; first female member of the Daedalian fraternity

Y
 Patricia Yapp Syau Yin, Malaysian military pilot; first Asian woman to fly a MiG-29
 Jeana Yeager (born 1952), co-pilot of the first non-stop flight around the world without refuelling

Z
Vera Zakharova (1920–2010), first Yakut woman pilot
Lydia Zvereva (1890–1916), first woman in Russia to earn a pilot's license

Organisations
 Air Transport Auxiliary (ATA)
 Betsy Ross Air Corps
 Night Witches
 Ninety-Nines
 Women Airforce Service Pilots (WASP)
 Women in Aviation, International
 Women's Air Derby
 Women's Auxiliary Air Force (WAAF)
 Women's Flying Training Detachment
 Women's Royal Air Force

See also 

 Timeline of women in aviation
 Women in aviation

References

Citations

Sources

Women
Aviators
List of women aviators